Arthur Desmond Colquhoun Gore, 9th Earl of Arran (born 14 July 1938), styled Viscount Sudley between 1958 and 1983, is a British peer and Lord Temporal in the House of Lords, sitting with the Conservative Party.

Early life
Lord Arran was born in Westminster, the eldest son of The 8th Earl of Arran and the former Fiona Colquhoun, first daughter of Sir Iain Colquhoun of Luss, 7th Baronet. He was educated at Eton College and Balliol College, Oxford.

Career
He served in the Grenadier Guards, gaining the rank of second lieutenant. He was the assistant manager of the Daily Mail, then assistant general manager of the Daily Express and the Sunday Express in the 1970s. He was a director of Waterstone's (1984–87).

He succeeded as 9th Earl of Arran of the Arran Islands on 23 February 1983, upon the death of his father. In the Lords, Lord Arran has played an active role for the Conservative Party, serving in several junior ministerial roles.

Marriage and children
On 28 September 1974, Arran married Eleanor van Cutsem, daughter of Bernard van Cutsem and Lady Margaret Fortescue, and granddaughter of Hugh Fortescue, 5th Earl Fortescue, and heiress of the Fortescue seat of Castle Hill, in Devon. She was appointed a Member of the Order of the British Empire (MBE) in the Queen's Birthday Honours 2008. Lord and Lady Arran run the Fortescue family's stately home, Castle Hill House and gardens in Devon, as a venue for weddings and corporate hospitality. He has no son, but has two daughters:

Lady Laura Melissa Fortescue-Gore (born 14 June 1975), who married Major James Duckworth-Chad (maternal great-grandson of 7th Earl Spencer) on 16 October 2004. They have four children. 
Lady Lucy Katherine Fortescue-Gore (born 26 October 1976)

Heir presumptive
Since Lord Arran has no sons by his wife, and all other lines of descent from the 4th Earl of Arran have died out, his heir presumptive is currently his very distant cousin, William Henry Gore (born 1950), who lives in Australia, descended from the youngest brother of the 4th Earl.

Arms

References

External links

1938 births
Living people
Alumni of Balliol College, Oxford
People educated at Eton College
Grenadier Guards officers
Conservative Party (UK) Baronesses- and Lords-in-Waiting
Arthur
Tennant family
Northern Ireland Office junior ministers
Earls of Arran (Ireland)
Hereditary peers elected under the House of Lords Act 1999